Robin John Gibson (born 15 November 1979) is an English footballer who played as a midfielder in the Football League for Wrexham.

Playing career

Crewe Alexandra & Wrexham
Gibson was a trainee for Crewe Alexandra at the age of 15. After that he joined Wrexham in 1998 and made 77 league appearances. He is most remembered for his major goal against Middlesbrough in the FA Cup; knocking them out. On 17 April 2002, Gibson was released with seven other players due to financial cut-backs.

Stafford Rangers
He later joined Stafford Rangers and went on to make over 100 appearances and has won the Staffs Senior Cup medal twice. He also scored a penalty for Stafford in the play-off semi-final against Harrogate Town in a game which led to their promotion to the conference at the expense of his current club Droylseden in the final.

Droylsden and non-league
He left Stafford in the summer of 2007 and signed for newly promoted Droylsden who won the Conference North in the 2006–07 season. Gibson then had a short spell at Nantwich Town where he failed to impress and was later signed by Leigh RMI. After spending a few months at Leigh RMI he was released. Later Robin "Gibbo" Gibson signed for Nantwich Town.

References

External links

1979 births
Living people
Association football midfielders
Sportspeople from Crewe
Wrexham A.F.C. players
Stafford Rangers F.C. players
Nantwich Town F.C. players
Droylsden F.C. players
English Football League players
National League (English football) players
English footballers